The 1928 NCAA Wrestling Championships were contested at the first annual NCAA-sponsored wrestling meet to determine the individual national champions of collegiate wrestling in the United States. The inaugural edition was hosted by the Iowa Agricultural College (now known as Iowa State) at State Gymnasium in Ames, Iowa.

Unlike later editions in 1929 and 1930, and every NCAA Wrestling Championship event since 1934, no team championship was awarded. A total of seven individual championships were awarded across seven corresponding weight classes. Oklahoma A&M, nonetheless, won four of the seven weight classes and have been subsequently deemed the 1928 unofficial national team champions.

Summary of results

Source:

See also
 Pre-NCAA Wrestling Champion

References

NCAA Division I Wrestling Championship
Wrestling competitions in the United States
NCAA Wrestling Championships
NCAA Wrestling Championships
NCAA Wrestling Championships